Maerten Boelema de Stomme (1611 in Leeuwarden – after 1644 in Haarlem), was a Dutch Golden Age painter.

Biography
According to the RKD he was a pupil of Willem Claesz Heda in 1642 and signed his works 'M.B. de Stomme'. Dated works are known from the short period 1642-1644. Boelema called himself "de Stomme" as he was mute. He specialized in stilllifes with so called Roemer glasses filled with white wine, nuts, knives decorated with mother of pearl, half peeled lemons, wine leaves and silver plates. These often stand directly on a stone board or on a heavy green or rosa tablecloth decorated with gold fringes.

References

Maerten Boelema de Stomme on Artnet

1611 births
1644 deaths
Dutch Golden Age painters
Dutch male painters
People from Leeuwarden
Dutch still life painters